The Bârgău is a right tributary of the river Bistrița in Romania. It discharges into the Bistrița in Prundu Bârgăului. Its valley is on the west side of the Tihuța Pass.

References

Rivers of Romania
Rivers of Bistrița-Năsăud County